"Who I Was Born to Be" is the first original song recorded by Susan Boyle, appearing on her multi-platinum debut album I Dreamed a Dream. The song has become a staple in Boyle's repertoire. The songs lyrics speak to Boyle's decades long dream of becoming a professional singer. The lyric has become associated with Boyle who titled her autobiography The Woman I Was Born to Be.

History 

The lyrics were written by singer/songwriter Audra Mae, grandniece of Judy Garland.  In an interview with MTV Audra Mae stated, "I knew it needed to be a song that made sense for her to sing, so I went online and researched her and her life and found out how she got to be where she is, and it came from that".  "I knew it needed to be something that she could be proud to sing," Mae explained. "Almost like a mantra — and I'm thrilled that she liked it enough to put it on the album."  The music to "Who I Was Born to Be" was composed by Johan Fransson, Tim Larsson, and Tobias Lundgren.

Performances 
Among her most notable performances of "Who I Was Born to Be", Boyle's first live performance of this song was on 7 December, 2009 in London before an audience for the taping of her television special I Dreamed a Dream: The Susan Boyle Story. "Who I Was Born to Be" was used as the theme song for the anime Welcome to the Space Show which was released in 2010. Boyle performed the song on The Oprah Winfrey Show in Chicago on 19 January 2010. On 10 July 2011 she performed it in front of a live audience of 58,000 in the Shanghai Grand Stadium for China's Got Talent viewed by a 560 million television audience. In recent years Boyle performed "Who I Was Born to Be" in an appearance at the end of the touring musical I Dreamed a Dream in the U.K. March-October 2012 and during her Susan Boyle in Concert tour of Scotland in July 2013. In August 2013 Boyle performed the song during the opening ceremonies of the 2013 Special Olympics held at the Royal Crescent in Bath.

References

2009 songs
Susan Boyle songs
Song recordings produced by Steve Mac
Songs written by Tim Larsson
Songs written by Tobias Lundgren
Songs written by Johan Fransson (songwriter)
Songs written by Audra Mae